The 1979 Monaco Grand Prix was a Formula One motor race held on 27 May 1979 at Monaco. It was the 37th Monaco Grand Prix and the seventh round of the 1979 Formula One season.

The 76-lap race was won from pole position by Jody Scheckter, driving a Ferrari. Clay Regazzoni finished second in a Williams-Ford, with Carlos Reutemann third in a Lotus-Ford. Patrick Depailler set the fastest lap of the race in a Ligier-Ford.

In a race of attrition, John Watson was fourth in his McLaren-Ford, Depailler fifth despite an engine failure on the last lap, and Jochen Mass sixth in his Arrows A1. Mass had run as high as third in the race and seemed to be closing in on the leaders before brake issues dropped him down the field.

This was the final Formula One race for  World Champion James Hunt. Hunt qualified tenth in his Wolf-Ford before retiring after four laps with a transmission problem.

Classification

Qualifying

Race

Championship standings after the race

Drivers' Championship standings

Constructors' Championship standings

References

External links

 Results at ESPN
 Race report at Grandprix.com

Monaco Grand Prix
Monaco Grand Prix
Grand Prix
Monaco Grand Prix